The year 2014 is the 22nd year in the history of the Ultimate Fighting Championship (UFC), a mixed martial arts promotion based in the United States.

Title fights

The Ultimate Fighter

Debut UFC fighters

The following fighters fought their first UFC fight in 2014:

Aaron Phillips
Aisling Daly
Akbarh Arreola
Alan Jouban
Alan Omer
Albert Cheng
Albert Tumenov
Alberto Mina
Alejandro Pérez
Alex Chambers
Alex White
Alexander Yakovlev
Alexis Dufresne
Aljamain Sterling
Andreas Ståhl
Andy Enz
Angela Hill
Angela Magaña
Anthony Birchak
Anthony Hamilton
Antônio Carlos Jr.
Antônio dos Santos Jr.
Ashlee Evans-Smith
Augusto Montaño
Bec Rawlings
Beneil Dariush
Brendan O'Reilly
Brian Ortega
Bryan Barberena
Bubba Bush
Bubba McDaniel
Cain Carrizosa
Carla Esparza
Carlos Diego Ferreira
Cathal Pendred
Chad Laprise
Charles Rosa
Chas Skelly
Chris Beal
Chris Dempsey
Chris Heatherly
Chris Indich
Chris Kelades
Chris Wade
Christos Giagos
Cláudia Gadelha
Cláudio Silva
Clay Collard
Cody Gibson
Colby Covington
Corey Anderson
Damon Jackson
Dan Hooker
Dan Kelly
Daniel Spohn
Danny Martinez
Danny Mitchell
Dashon Johnson
Dave Galera
David Michaud
Derrick Lewis
Dhiego Lima
Diego Rivas
Doo Ho Choi
Douglas Silva de Andrade
Eddie Alvarez
Eddie Gordon
Elias Theodorou
Elizabeth Phillips
Emily Kagan
Ernest Chavez
Felice Herrig
Francisco Treviño
Frankie Saenz
Gabriel Benítez
Gasan Umalatov
George Sullivan
Gilbert Burns
Guido Cannetti
Guilherme Vasconcelos
Guto Inocente
Hans Stringer
Heather Jo Clark
Héctor Urbina
Henry Briones
Henry Cejudo
Hernani Perpétuo
Humberto Brown
Ian Entwistle
Jack May
Jake Collier
Jake Lindsey
Jake Matthews
James Moontasri
Jan Blachowicz
Jason Saggo
Jerrod Sanders
Jessica Penne
Jim Alers
Joanna Jędrzejczyk
Joanne Calderwood
Joby Sanchez
Joe Ellenberger
Joe Soto
Johnny Case
Jon Delos Reyes
Jorge de Oliveira
Jose Alberto Quinonez
Josh Copeland
Josh Shockley
Juan Puig
Juliana Lima
Jumabieke Tuerxun
Justin Jones
Kailin Curran
Kajan Johnson
Katsunori Kikuno
Keith Berish
Kevin Lee
Kiichi Kunimoto
Larissa Pacheco
Lauren Murphy
Leandro Issa
Leon Edwards
Leonardo Morales
Leslie Smith
Li Jingliang
Lisa Ellis
Louis Smolka
Luiz Dutra
Luke Zachrich
Mairbek Taisumov
Marcin Bandel
Márcio Alexandre Jr.
Marco Beltrán
Marcos Rogério de Lima
Mark Eddiva
Marlon Vera
Masanori Kanehara
Mats Nilsson
Matt Dwyer
Matt Hobar
Matt Van Buren
Michinori Tanaka
Mike De La Torre
Mike King
Mike Rhodes
Milana Dudieva
Mirsad Bektic
Neil Seery
Nick Hein
Niklas Bäckström
Nina Ansaroff
Ning Guangyou
Noad Lahat
Nolan Ticman
Nordine Taleb
Oleksiy Oliynyk
Olivier Aubin-Mercier
Paige VanZant
Patrick Cummins
Patrick Holohan
Patrick Walsh
Patrick Williams
Paul Felder
Pawel Pawlak
Pedro Munhoz
Randa Markos
Rashid Magomedov
Ray Borg
Renato Moicano
Ricardo Abreu
Richard Walsh
Richardson Moreira
Rin Nakai
Rob Font
Robert Drysdale
Rodolfo Rubio
Rodrigo de Lima
Roger Narvaez
Roldan Sangcha-an
Roman Salazar
Rose Namajunas
Royston Wee
Ruan Potts
Ruslan Magomedov
Russell Doane
Sam Alvey
Sarah Moras
Scott Askham
Sean O'Connell
Sean Soriano
Sean Strickland
Seohee Ham
Shane Howell
Shayna Baszler
Sheldon Westcott
Shinsho Anzai
Shunichi Shimizu
Tae Hyun Bang
Takenori Sato
Tarec Saffiedine
Tateki Matsuda
Tatsuya Kawajiri
Tecia Torres
Thomas Almeida
Tiago Trator
Tim Gorman
Tina Lähdemäki
Tony Martin
Ulka Sasaki
Valérie Létourneau
Valmir Lazaro
Viktor Pešta
Vitor Miranda
Wagner Silva
Wang Anying
Wang Sai
Warlley Alves
Wendell Oliveira
Will Chope
Willie Gates
Yair Rodríguez
Yang Jianping
Yao Zhikui
Yosdenis Cedeno
Yui Chul Nam
Zhang Lipeng
Zubaira Tukhugov

Events list

See also
 UFC
 List of UFC champions
 List of UFC events

References

External links
 UFC past events on UFC.com
 UFC events results at Sherdog.com
 UFC Upcoming events and Past event results at Boldtiger.com

2014 in mixed martial arts
Ultimate Fighting Championship by year